Osmar Francisco Moreira Jesuino, or simply Osmar (born 10 August 1987) is a Brazilian footballer  who plays as a forward for Kirivong Sok Sen Chey.

Career
Osmar joined J2 League club Avispa Fukuoka in August 2012. He made his debut on 12 August 2012 against Shonan Bellmare, losing the game 3-1.

On 10 August 2013, Osmar joined Ehime FC, on a half-year loan from Fukuoka.

Hoàng Anh Gia Lai
Osmar joined V.League 1 club Hoàng Anh Gia Lai in December 2015.

References

External links

1987 births
Living people
Brazilian footballers
Brazilian expatriate footballers
Paraná Clube players
Operário Ferroviário Esporte Clube players
Santa Cruz Futebol Clube players
Avispa Fukuoka players
Ehime FC players
Mito HollyHock players
Hoang Anh Gia Lai FC players
Song Lam Nghe An FC players
Clube Esportivo Lajeadense players
Foz do Iguaçu Futebol Clube players
Clube Atlético Penapolense players
Rio Branco Sport Club players
J2 League players
V.League 1 players
Association football forwards
Expatriate footballers in Japan
Expatriate footballers in Vietnam
Expatriate footballers in Cambodia
Brazilian expatriate sportspeople in Japan
Brazilian expatriate sportspeople in Vietnam
Brazilian expatriate sportspeople in Cambodia